Gula (Sara Gula) is a Bongo–Bagirmi language of Chad.

References

Languages of Chad
Bongo–Bagirmi languages